Lorenzo Lonardi (born 10 February 1999) is an Italian professional footballer who plays as a midfielder for  club Virtus Verona.

Club career
Born in Verona, Lonardi started his career in Serie D club GSD Ambrosiana.

In 2020, he joined Serie C club Virtus Verona. Lonardi made his professional debut on 27 September 2020 against Cesena. He extended his contract the next season.

References

External links
 
 

1999 births
Living people
Footballers from Verona
Italian footballers
Association football midfielders
Serie C players
Serie D players
Milano City F.C. players
Virtus Verona players